King's Highway is located in the Oak Cliff area of Dallas, Texas (USA). The district is bounded by Stewart Drive on the north, Davis Street on the south, Tyler Street on the east and Mary Cliff Road on the west. It is in Dallas Council District 3.

The conservation district was established in 1988 as the first conservation district in the city by Dallas Ordinance 19910, and governs zoning, renovations and replacements, setbacks, etc. Replacement houses are required to meet standards making them similar to the surrounding houses and houses of the period, discouraging teardowns and preventing modern suburban-style architecture.

A quote from the conservation documents:

See also

National Register of Historic Places listings in Dallas County, Texas

References

External links

Kings Highway Neighborhood Association
Old Oak Cliff Conservation League
CliffDweller Magazine

National Register of Historic Places in Dallas
Historic districts on the National Register of Historic Places in Texas